Marie Reisik (born 6 February 1887 in Kilingi-Nõmme, died 3 August 1941 in Tallinn, Estonia), an Estonian teacher, women rights activist and politician.

Biography
Marie Reisik was born 6 February 1887 in Kilingi-Nõmme. She attended school in Pärnu, yet as women in Estonia could not enter the university at that time, Reisik studied in Paris and became a teacher of French. She was one of the founder of the first women's organisation in Estonia in 1907, the Tartu Eesti Naesterahva Selts, and she founded the first political journal for women, “Naisterahva Töö ja Elu” (“Women’s Work and Life”) which united educated women of Estonia. Her work contributed to organizing the first Estonian Women Congress (1917) which helped to found Estonian Women's Union (1920). She initiated the emancipation movements across the country and became an active politician. In 1919, she was elected to the Estonian Constituent Assembly and she was the only member of the parliament. In 1941, he was wanted by the NKVD. Marie Reisik died on 3 August 1941 in Tallinn Central Hospital and is buried in Liiva cemetery.

References 

1887 births
1941 deaths
People from Kilingi-Nõmme
People from Kreis Pernau
Estonian People's Party politicians
National Centre Party (Estonia) politicians
Members of the Estonian Constituent Assembly
Members of the Riigikogu, 1929–1932
Members of the Riigikogu, 1932–1934
20th-century Estonian women politicians
Estonian women in politics
Estonian feminists
Burials at Liiva Cemetery